Sir Abubakar Tafawa Balewa  (December 1912 – 15 January 1966) was a Nigerian politician who served as the first and only Prime Minister of Nigeria upon independence.

Early life
Abubakar Tafawa Balewa was born in December 1912 in modern-day Bauchi State, in the Northern Nigeria Protectorate. Balewa's father, Yakubu Dan Zala, was of Gere ethnicity, and his mother Fatima Inna was of Gere and Fulani descent. His father worked in the house of the district head of Lere, a district within the Bauchi Emirate.

Education 
Balewa began his education at a Qur'anic school in Bauchi; when southern colonial administrators began to push for western education in the Northern region, Balewa was among the children sent to Tafawa Balewa Elementary School, after the Qur'anic school. Thereafter, he proceeded to Bauchi Provincial School. Like many of his contemporaries, he studied at Barewa College, then known as Katsina College, where he was student number 145. Ahmadu Rabah, later known as Ahmadu Bello, was student number 87 and was two years his senior, while Abubakar Imam was a year ahead of him. The college was several kilometers from Bauchi and was not close to a railway station nor other public transportation. During holidays, which was twice a year, Balewa trekked home, a journey of more than 400 kilometers. He trekked for 40 kilometers a day, before finding a resting place at a nearby village. In total, the journey took him 10 days.

Katsina College had British expatriate teachers, many of whom had been educated at leading British schools and then attended Cambridge or Oxford Universities. Students were taught in English, and speech was an important part of learning for the students. Apart from excellence in English, the school was also a training ground for teachers to be posted to the provincial and middle schools within the Northern Provinces of Nigeria.

Balewa completed his five-year education in 1933 and returned to Bauchi to teach at Bauchi Middle School. He taught at the school and rose to become a senior schoolmaster. In 1941, he became acquainted with a young Aminu Kano, who was posted to the school as a teacher. After a student unrest, investigations into student grievances indicted the headmaster, and in 1941 Balewa was nominated as the new headmaster. In 1944, Balewa and some other educated teachers in the Northern Provinces were chosen to study abroad at the University of London's Institute of Education, which today forms part of University College London. Upon returning to Nigeria, he became an Inspector of Schools for the colonial administration and later entered politics.

Political activity 
He was elected in 1946 to the Northern House of Assembly, and to the Legislative Council in 1947. As a legislator, he was a vocal advocate of the rights of Northern Nigeria. He supported hesitance by the North to become independent, based on the objection that the north and south regions were not at an equal footing. In the Northern Assembly, he sought more roles and responsibility in the Native Administration for the educated members of the emirates.

Together with Alhaji Sir Ahmadu Bello, who held the hereditary title of Sardauna of Sokoto, they proposed the transformation of the cultural organization, Jam'iyyar Mutanen Arewa, which means Northern People's Congress (NPC) in English, to become a political platform for use as campaign platform during the elections of 1951. Balewa was elected Vice President of the new party and subsequently resigned his post as headmaster of Bauchi Middle School. NPC won the plurality of votes to the regional House of Assembly in 1951.

Balewa was among the new legislators in Kaduna. Under a new constitution, the Macpherson Constitution of 1951, an electoral college system was implemented whereby, some regional legislators were elected to the Federal House of Representatives in Lagos, and among the federal legislators, three members from each region would be appointed federal ministers with portfolio. Balewa was among those nominated to Lagos and along with Kashim Ibrahim and Muhammadu Ribadu were nominated to become ministers.

Balewa entered the government in 1952 as Minister of Works, and later served as Minister of Transport during a time Nigeria was moving towards self-government.  During his tenure at the transport ministry, both the Marine and Railway departments were transformed to corporations and the designs for a bridge over the Niger and plans for the Kainji Dam were developed.

In 1957, NPC won the plurality of votes in the Federal House of Representatives and Balewa became the Chief Minister and designated Prime Minister. As part of his plans to unify the country towards the move for independence in 1960, he formed a coalition government between the NPC and the National Council of Nigeria and the Cameroons (NCNC), led by Nnamdi Azikiwe and also invited the Action Group (A.G.), the 1957 cabinet was constituted as an all party cabinet. Though, Awolowo, the leader of A.G. and premier of the Western region was skeptical of the plan, the national executive committee of Action Group party endorsed the National Government and Ayo Rosiji and Samuel Akintola were nominated by the party. During this period, Balewa developed a close relationship with K.O. Mbadiwe from NCNC and Akintola from AG.

Prime minister 

Balewa retained the post as Prime Minister of Nigeria when Nigeria gained independence in 1960, and was reelected in 1964.

Prior to Nigeria's independence, a constitutional conference in 1954 had adopted a regional political framework for the country, with all regions given a considerable amount of political freedom. The three regions then were composed of diverse cultural groups. The premiers and some prominent leaders of the regions later took on a policy of guiding their regions against political encroachment from other regional leaders. Later on, this political environment influenced the Balewa administration. His term in office was turbulent, with regional factionalism constantly threatening his government.

However, as Prime Minister of Nigeria, Balewa played important roles in the continent's formative indigenous rule. He was an important leader in the formation of the Organisation of African Unity and creating a cooperative relationship with French speaking African countries. He was also instrumental in negotiations between Moise Tshombe and the Congolese authorities during the Congo Crisis of 1960–1964. He led a vocal protest against the Sharpeville Massacre of 1960 and also entered into an alliance with Commonwealth ministers who wanted South Africa to leave the Commonwealth in 1961. However, a treason charge and conviction against one of the western region's leaders, Obafemi Awolowo, led to protest and condemnation from many of his supporters. The 1965 election in the region later produced violent protests. Rioting and violence were soon synchronous with what was perceived as inordinate political encroachment and an over-exuberant election outcome for Awolowo's western opponents.

As Prime Minister of Nigeria, Balewa, from 1960 to 1961, doubled as Foreign Affairs advocate of Nigeria. In 1961, the Balewa government created an official Foreign Affairs and Commonwealth Relations ministerial position in favour of Jaja Wachuku who became, from 1961 to 1965, the first substantive Nigerian Minister of Foreign Affairs and Commonwealth Relations, later called External Affairs.

Overthrow

Balewa was overthrown and murdered in a military coup on 15 January 1966, as were many other leaders, including his old companion Sir Ahmadu Bello. The circumstances of his death still remain unresolved. His body was discovered at a roadside near Lagos six days after he was ousted from office. Balewa was buried in Bauchi. News of his assassination spurred violent riots throughout Northern Nigeria and ultimately led to the bloody counter-coup of July 1966.

Shaihu Umar
In 1933, Balewa wrote Shaihu Umar, a novella about a pious Muslim in response to a request by Rupert East, the head of the colonial Translation Bureau, to promote Hausa literature. Shaihu Umar was first published in 1934. An English translation by Mervyn Hiskett was published in 1967.

Written in a prose homily structure, the protagonist, Shaihu Umar, recounts his events in his life's history. Events and themes in the novel deal with the trans-Saharan slave trade, familial relationships and Islamic themes of submission to the will of God.

Shaihu Umar was staged as a play in the 1970s.

Honours

In January 1960, Balewa was knighted by Her Majesty Queen Elizabeth II as a Knight Commander of the Order of the British Empire. He was awarded an honorary doctorate from the University of Sheffield in May 1960. He was also awarded an honorary doctorate of laws from the New York University in July 1961.

Balewa's portrait was placed on the 5 Naira Note. The Abubakar Tafawa Balewa University in Bauchi was named in his honour.

Personal life
Balewa was described as modest and self-effacing. At his death, his major assets included his house in Bauchi and a 50-acre farm where he vacationed when he wanted to relax. The farm was located on the way to Tafawa Balewa village about nine miles outside Bauchi; many official decisions while in office were taken at the farm. Balewa was married to four women who bore him nineteen children.

Balewa was buried in Tafawa Balewa's tomb at Bauchi.

See also

 
 Nigerian First Republic
 Cabinet of Abubakar Tafawa Balewa

References

Kalu Ezera;, Constitutional Developments in Nigeria: An Analytical Study of Nigeria's Constitution-Making Developments and the Historical and Political Factors That Affected Constitutional Change, 1960
James S. Olson, Robert S. Shadle; Historical Dictionary of the British Empire, Greenwood Press, 1996
B. I. C. Ijomah, The Enigma of Nigerian Nationalism, Edo State University Publishing House, 1996, 
Alh. Sir Abubakar Tafawa Balewa official visit to USA in 25–28 July 1961, YouTube.

1912 births
1966 deaths
People from Bauchi State
Assassinated Nigerian politicians
Prime Ministers of Nigeria
Foreign ministers of Nigeria
Leaders ousted by a coup
Deaths by firearm in Nigeria
Alumni of the UCL Institute of Education
Nigerian recipients of British titles
Nigerian knights
Nigerian Muslims
Knights Commander of the Order of the British Empire
Politicians awarded knighthoods
People murdered in Nigeria
Assassinated heads of government
20th-century Nigerian politicians
Northern People's Congress politicians
Burials in Bauchi State
Nigerian revolutionaries
People from colonial Nigeria
Members of the Privy Council of the United Kingdom
1966 murders in Nigeria